Frog Mountain is a summit in Cherokee County, Alabama, in the United States.

Frog Mountain was named after Chief Frog, of the Cherokee.

References

Landforms of Cherokee County, Alabama
Mountains of Alabama